Coleophora impunctata is a moth of the family Coleophoridae. It is found in Afghanistan and Turkestan.

References

impunctata
Moths described in 1967
Moths of Asia